This grooved surface of the foramen magnum is separated on either side from the petrous portion of the temporal bone by the petro-occipital fissure, which is occupied in the fresh state by a plate of cartilage; the fissure is continuous behind with the jugular foramen, and its margins are grooved for the inferior petrosal sinus.

References

External links
 

Bones of the head and neck